ManagePro is a project and performance management software product produced by Angbert Enterprises, LLC, a US software and IT consulting company headquartered in Downey, California.

History

ManagePro was originally developed in 1992 by Avantos Performance Systems, based in part on Drucker's work on Management by Objectives and described as "MBA-ware, or management software" by Fortune Magazine.

It was purchased in 1998 by Performance Solutions Technology and rewritten to include project  and performance management tools; as well as an emphasis on supporting a strategic management approach based upon Action Learning  that links to day-to-day task management as described by David Allen in "Get Things Done''.

It was purchased again in 2018 by Angbert Enterprises LLC, and will again go through a re-write to include cross-platform capabilities. and a true cloud and tablet app.

The software has undergone 11 major upgrades ranging from expanded information-sharing capabilities, focusing on connectivity as it relates to ease of use  and adding the strategic and operational level tools.
 
In 2002, ManagePro partners with MindJet, makers of MindManager software, which enables users to capture and communicate ideas and information with a visual interface. In 1993, ManagePro was awarded "Best Business Application:Word or Text" by Best CodiE 

In 2008, ManagePro released their Microsoft Outlook Add-in which enables users to directly link email to a project, task, or phase of the work process

Software

Available as a Windows desktop (ManagePro(R)). It includes components for general goal and project management, strategic planning, task management, document management, scorecards, performance reviews, time cards, and WBS (Work Breakdown Structure).

Criticism

ManagePro is not the best project management software for large projects requiring scheduling of numerous resources or management of the critical path to project success. ManagePro's greatest strength is also its greatest weakness. This program was created by a group of top managers to reflect their methods and philosophy. If you don't work their way, you're stuck with an application that doesn't have a lot of flexibility

See also
 Project Management
 Management by Objectives
 Decision making software
 Gantt charts
 Portfolio management

References

Project management software